"Pity Party" is a song by American recording artist Melanie Martinez based on the 1963 Lesley Gore hit "It's My Party". It was released as the third single from her debut album, Cry Baby (2015), on June 2, 2015. The music video was released on June 1, 2015. It impacted contemporary hit radio on March 22, 2016.

Background and composition
An alt-pop and electro track, the song uses the chorus from Lesley Gore's "It's My Party" released in 1963, as an interpolation, and also employs the iconic repeating-note horns hook from the original song as the recurring theme throughout. On July 28, 2016, the song was certified Gold by the RIAA, having sold 500,000 copies.

Regarding the song, Martinez said, "This was during my second session with Kara DioGuardi. It was awesome to write that song because I love music from the 50s and 60s. When I was singing, Kara said my voice reminded her of Judy Garland and artists from that time. I really wanted to write about no one showing up to my birthday party and the song is perfect inspiration for this theme. I love samples, especially older songs because they can put a fresh new take on an old song. So we were really inspired by that and we sampled it for the first line of the chorus and that is how 'Pity Party' came about".

Mike Wass of Idolator noted how both "Pity Party" and Grace's single "You Don't Own Me" are based on Lesley Gore songs, saying "there seems to be a revival of the late [Gore's] music afoot".

Music video
The music video for "Pity Party" was released on June 1, 2015. However, the video was leaked 3 days prior to the official release.
The video was directed by Melanie herself, she describes it as a "fun experience for her", considering she's the only person featured in the video.

A behind the scenes video was released June 17, 2015.

Track listing

Charts

Certifications

Release history

Pity Party EP

Pity Party EP is Melanie Martinez's second EP, released digitally on May 6, 2016 in Ireland, Mexico and the UK.

Track listing

Notes

References

2015 singles
2015 songs
Melanie Martinez songs
Atlantic Records singles
Songs written by Melanie Martinez
Songs written by Wally Gold
Songs written by Kara DioGuardi
Torch songs
Songs written by CJ Baran
Songs about birthdays
Songs about birthday parties
Songs about parties
Songs about loneliness